Charles Breijer (26 November 1914, The Hague – 18 August 2011, Hilversum) was a Dutch photographer, known as a "resistance photographer," notable especially for the photographs he took during the last year of the German occupation of The Netherlands during World War II. Breijer was a member of Nederlandsche Vereeniging voor Ambachts- en Nijverheidskunst (V.A.N.K.) the Dutch Association for Craft and Craft Art.

Some photographs

The Netherlands 1945

Indonesia c. 1950

References

1914 births
2011 deaths
Photographers from The Hague
Dutch resistance members